This is an all-time list of the Liechtenstein women's national football team results.

Results

2021

2022

References

Women's national association football team results